Oxabolone cipionate (brand names Steranabol Depo, Steranabol Ritardo; former developmental code name FI-5852), or oxabolone cypionate, also known as 4-hydroxy-19-nortestosterone 17β-cypionate or estr-4-en-4,17β-diol-3-one 17β-cypionate, is synthetic and injected anabolic–androgenic steroid (AAS) and derivative of nandrolone (19-nortestosterone) which has been marketed in Europe. It is the C17β cypionate ester and a prodrug of oxabolone (4-hydroxy-19-nortestosterone).

See also
 4-Hydroxytestosterone
 Clostebol (4-chlorotestosterone)
 Formestane (4-hydroxyandrostenedione)
 Norclostebol (4-chloro-19-nortestosterone)

References

Androgen esters
Androgens and anabolic steroids
Cypionate esters
Enols
Enones
Estranes
Prodrugs